Sara Hendershot (born April 27, 1988) is an American rower from West Simsbury, CT, who competed at the 2012 Summer Olympics in the women's pair with Sarah Zelenka.

Sara played soccer and swimming in high school, but began rowing full-time in college at Princeton University. She was named a Division I First-Team All-American her junior and senior years of college. Sara won the gold medal in the women's eight at the 2010 World Rowing U23 Championships. She also won gold in the four at the 2011 World Rowing Championships. Sara qualified for the 2012 Summer Olympics after winning the women's pair with Sarah Zelenka at the 2012 U.S. Olympic Trials. On July 28, 2012 Sara qualified for the Olympic finals after recording a time of 6:59.29 in the preliminaries. In the finals, Sara's pair came in fourth with a time of 7:30.39.

See also
List of Princeton University Olympians

References

American female rowers
Olympic rowers of the United States
Rowers at the 2012 Summer Olympics
Rowers from Boston
Princeton University alumni
1988 births
Living people
World Rowing Championships medalists for the United States
21st-century American women